Blue Plate is a brand of mayonnaise owned by Reily Foods Company, headquartered in New Orleans, Louisiana.

Blue Plate was created by the Wesson Oil & Snowdrift Company in 1929 and founded by Charles A. Nehlig, chief operating officer of subsidiary company Gulf and Valley Cotton Oil Company. One of the first commercially prepared mayonnaise brands in the United States, it was produced in Gretna, Louisiana until 1941 when production was moved to the Blue Plate Building in Gert Town, New Orleans. Reily Foods purchased Blue Plate in 1974 and continued to use the same factory until production was moved in 2000 to the Reily Foods factory in Knoxville, Tennessee.

The Blue Plate Building has since been converted into the Blue Plate Artist Lofts and is listed on the National Register of Historic Places. In 2018, Epicurious listed Blue Plate as "the best mayonnaise you can buy in a grocery store."

See also
 List of mayonnaises

References 

Food manufacturers of the United States
Manufacturing companies based in New Orleans
Condiment companies of the United States
Mayonnaise
1929 establishments in Louisiana
American companies established in 1929